Leslie Barbara Butch, often known as Barbara Butch is a French disc jockey and lesbian activist. She campaigns for fat acceptance and has made a short film Extra Large. She was awarded the  2021 "personnalité LGBTI de l'année"  ("LGBTI personality of the year") by the French Association of LGBTI Journalists.

References

External links

Year of birth missing (living people)
Living people
LGBT DJs
French DJs
French lesbian musicians
Fat acceptance activists
21st-century French women musicians
French women activists